Ian Moore (born August 8, 1968, in Berkeley, California, United States) is an American guitarist and singer-songwriter from Austin, Texas.

Discography

Albums
Ian Moore (Capricorn 1993)
Live from Austin (Capricorn 1994)
Modernday Folklore (Capricorn 1995)
Ian Moore's Got the Green Grass (Habaldor 1998)
And All the Colors... (Koch 2000)
Luminaria (Yep Roc 2004)
To Be Loved (Justice Records 2007)
El Sonido Nuevo (Spark & Shine 2010)
The First Third (Hablador 2011)
Thirty Songs in Thirty Days (2013)
Strange Days (2017)

EPs
Aerie (Hablador 2013)
The Noble Art (2016)
Toronto (Last Chance 2018)

Live albums
 'Live from Austin (Capricorn 1994)
 Live Via Satellite (Hablador 2001)

Videos
Bootleg '96 (1996)
Live from the Cactus Cafe (2003)

See also 
 Music of Austin

References

External links
 Ian Moore official website

1968 births
Living people
Musicians from Austin, Texas
American rock guitarists
American male guitarists
Musicians from Berkeley, California
Singers from California
Guitarists from California
Guitarists from Texas
20th-century American guitarists
20th-century American male musicians
Yep Roc Records artists